The Fiore di virtù ('flower of virtue') is an anonymous Italian prose treatise on morality from the first half of the 14th century. It was a popular and widely translated work into the 16th century.

Date and authorship
The Fiore was originally written in the Bolognese dialect, but later Tuscanized. It was originally written between 1313 and 1323, since it does not refer to Thomas Aquinas, who was canonized in 1323, as a saint. It may have been completed only later.

Two manuscripts attribute the Fiore to a "Brother Thomas", one of them giving his surname as Gozzadini and his order as the Benedictines. He has been identified with the Bolognese notary Tommaso Gozzadini, although he is not otherwise known to have been a monk. He does not appear in any document after 1329, when he may have retired to a monastery to finish his work, if he is indeed the author.

An expanded Italian version with six added chapters on love was printed at Florence in 1491.

Structure and content
It is divided into 35 chapters on virtues and vices. Each chapter offers a definition, an example drawn from the animal world of the bestiaries, a set of maxims and an exemplum. The model for the format of the Fiore was the Summa theologiae of Aquinas. The main source for the animal examples is Bartholomaeus Anglicus's De proprietatibus rerum. The author cites two contemporary vernacular works: Guido Guinizzelli's  and Dante Alighieri's Convivio.

Translations, editions and influence
In the 15th and 16th centuries, the Fiore was translated into Castilian, Catalan, French, English, Romanian, German, Persian, Armenian, Greek, Croatian, Russian and Serbian. There are at least 95 manuscripts of the Italian version and 57 printed editions from before 1501, including 35 from before 1489, when the first Catalan printing appeared. The Fiore was "probably the most popular of all books printed in Italian during the fifteenth century." Two French editions appeared in the 15th century.

The Castilian translation (Flor de virtudes) was in existence by 1470, when it was copied into the Cancionero de Juan Fernández de Íxar. The first Castilian edition, replete with Aragonesisms, was published in Zaragoza by Pablo and Juan Hurus in 1490. Five Catalan editions had appeared by 1502 and thirteen Castilian editions by the end of the 16th century. In 1583, the Spanish Inquisition added the Fiore to  because it was anonymous.

There are three Croatian recensions of the Fiore (or Cvijet kreposti) in each of the three scripts associated with the language: Glagolitic, Cyrillic and Latin. There are five manuscripts of the Glagolitic version in the Chakavian dialect. The earliest Cyrillic copy, copied at Dubrovnik in 1520, is in the Shtokavian dialect. It contains the additional chapters from the expanded Italian version.

It contains 10,172 verses. Towards the end of the work, Vintler began incorporating original material from ancient, patristic and philosophical sources. Max Siller argues that Vintler began his work in response to a feud between his family and Frederick IV, Duke of Austria, from 1407 to 1409.

The Fiore served as a source for the bestiaries of Franco Sacchetti and Leonardo da Vinci and for the Acerba of Cecco d'Ascoli. The Ristorato of Ristoro Canigiani is a versification of the Fiore.

Notes

Bibliography

14th-century books
Medieval Italian literature